Samuel Christopher Gentile (October 12, 1916 – May 4, 1998) was an outfielder in Major League Baseball who played for the Boston Braves during its 1943 season, being used exclusively as a pinch hitter and pinch runner in just eight games.

Sources

External links
, or Retrosheet

1916 births
1998 deaths
United States Navy personnel of World War II
Baseball players from Massachusetts
Boston Braves players
Canton Terriers players
Danville Leafs players
Danville-Scholfield Leafs players
Greensboro Red Sox players
Moultrie Packers players
Pawtucket Slaters players
Rocky Mount Red Sox players
St. John's University (New York City) alumni